Akçayunt (also known as Hozakpur) is a village in the Çemişgezek District, Tunceli Province, Turkey. The village is populated by Turks and had a population of 33 in 2021.

References 

Villages in Çemişgezek District